Phytoecia molybdaena is a species of beetle in the family Cerambycidae. It was described by Dalman in 1817. It has a wide distribution in Europe; its population in the Czech Republic is purportedly extinct.

References

Phytoecia
Beetles described in 1817